Sahu (Sa’u, Sahu’u, Sau) is a North Halmahera language. Use is vigorous; dialects are Pa’disua (Palisua), Tala’i, Waioli, and Gamkonora. A fifth dialect, Ibu, used to be spoken near the mouth of the Ibu River.

Sahu has many Ternate loanwords, a historical legacy of the dominance of the Ternate Sultanate in the Moluccas.

Phonology
Sahu, like other North Halmahera languages, is not a tonal language.

Consonants

When preceding /a/, /o/, and /u/, the consonants /d/, /ɗ/, and /l/ become retroflex (/ɖ/, /ᶑ/, and /ɭ/, respectively). The trill /r/ alternates freely with /ɾ/, but, according to Visser and Voorhoeve, /r/ is the more usual allophone. The glottal /h/ may be realized as the unvoiced uvular fricative /χ/ by educated speakers for certain words deriving from Arabic.

Vowels 

The phoneme /ə/ is only found in loans (primarily from Indonesian).

References

Languages of Indonesia

North Halmahera languages